Lac du Bonnet is a rural municipality in the province of Manitoba in western Canada, situated between the Nopiming Provincial Park to the northeast and Whiteshell Provincial Park to the southeast.

The separately-administered town of Lac du Bonnet lies within the borders of the municipality. It also mostly encircles the Pinawa local government district in the municipality's southeast part. A large portion of the municipality includes waters of the Winnipeg River and its tributaries.

The RM contains the southern part of Manitoba's Brightstone Sand Hills Provincial Forest and the northern part of Agassiz Provincial Forest, although most of these forests lie in other RMs.

Communities 
 Allegra
 Lee River
 McArthur Falls
 Milner Ridge
 Seddons Corner (part)
 Spring Well

Demographics 

References

External links

 Official website
 Map of Lac du Bonnet R.M. at Statcan

Rural municipalities in Manitoba